Licheng District is one of 10 urban districts of the prefecture-level city of Jinan, the capital of Shandong Province, East China, covering part of the eastern suburbs. It has an area of 1,303.88 km2 and has 1,124,306 permanent residents . The Jinan Yaoqiang International Airport is located in the district's northern reaches. The largest county-level division of Jinan by permanent resident population, it borders Zhangqiu District to the east, Changqing District to the southwest, the districts of Shizhong, Lixia, and Tianqiao to the west, Jiyang District to the northwest, as well as the prefecture-level city of Tai'an to the southeast.

Administrative divisions
As 2012, this district is divided to 6 subdistricts and 11 towns.
Subdistricts

Towns

See also 
 Nine Pinnacle Pagoda

References

External links
 Official home page 
 China Unearthed Shang Oracle Bones Again, 104 Years After the First Discovery 
 Inscribed Oracle Bones of Shang Dynasty Unearthed

Licheng
Jinan